Daniela Guzmán is an Ecuadorian singer and composer from Guayaquil.

Career
She was signed to the Universal Music Latin label between 2006 and 2008, and as of 2008 she recorded independently. In 2006, she signed with BMG as a composer. Guzmán left Ecuador for Miami in 2000; as of 2008, she continued to reside there.

References

Ecuadorian pop singers
Year of birth missing (living people)
Living people
21st-century Ecuadorian women singers
People from Guayaquil